Rostanga ankyra is a species of sea slug, a dorid nudibranch, a marine gastropod mollusc in the family Discodorididae.

Distribution
This species was collected from  depth, south of New Caledonia, 

Description
The living animal is uniformly white, with typical shape and caryophyllidia covering the mantle surface as is normal for species of Rostanga. Only three species of Rostanga are white in colour, Rostanga setidens and Rostanga phepha. Rostanga phepha'' has the dorsum covered with purplish brown spots.

References

Discodorididae
Gastropods described in 2001